The Marañón poison frog (Excidobates mysteriosus; rana venenosa in Spanish) is a species of frog in the family of the poison dart frogs or  Dendrobatidae. It is endemic to Cordillera del Condor in the upper Marañón River drainage of the Cajamarca Department, Peru. At the type locality its natural habitat is primary premontane forest. Breeding takes place in bromeliads. It is threatened by habitat loss. It may also be collected for international trade.

References

mysteriosus
Amphibians of Peru
Endemic fauna of Peru
Amphibians described in 1982
Taxonomy articles created by Polbot